The men's 3000 metres steeplechase event at the 1986 Commonwealth Games was held on 27 July at the Meadowbank Stadium in Edinburgh.

Results

References

Athletics at the 1986 Commonwealth Games
1986